David R Glynne-Jones (born 1929), is a Welsh born male former rower, who competed for England.

Rowing career
He represented England and won a silver medal in the eights and a bronze medal in the coxed fours at the 1954 British Empire and Commonwealth Games in Vancouver, Canada.

References

1929 births
English male rowers
Welsh male rowers
Commonwealth Games medallists in rowing
Commonwealth Games silver medallists for England
Commonwealth Games bronze medallists for England
Living people
Rowers at the 1954 British Empire and Commonwealth Games
Medallists at the 1954 British Empire and Commonwealth Games